Guludash Peak is a peak in Talysh Mountains range in southeastern Azerbaijan.

The Vilesh River headwaters are in this peak.

Sources
Viləşçay river

Mountains of Azerbaijan
Two-thousanders of the Caucasus